is a passenger railway station located in the city of Imabari, Ehime Prefecture, Japan. It is operated by JR Shikoku and has the station number "Y45".

Lines
Kikuma Station is served by the JR Shikoku Yosan Line and is located 165.9 km from the beginning of the line at Takamatsu Station. Connections with other local or limited express trains are needed to travel further east or west along the line.

Layout
The station, which is unstaffed, consists of two staggered opposed side platforms serving two tracks. A station building serves as a waiting room and is linked to platform 1. Access to platform 2 is by means of a footbridge. Parking is available at the station forecourt and there is a designated parking area for bicycles. A siding branches off line 1 and leads to an area behind and to one side of the station building and is used mainly by track maintenance equipment.

Adjacent stations

History
At that time the station was operated by Japanese Government Railways, later becoming Japanese National Railways (JNR). With the privatization of JNR on 1 April 1987, control of the station passed to JR Shikoku.

Surrounding area
Kawara no Furusato Park
Imabari City Hall Kikuma Branch
Japan National Route 196

See also
 List of railway stations in Japan

References

External links

Station timetable

Railway stations in Ehime Prefecture
Railway stations in Japan opened in 1925
Imabari, Ehime